is a Japanese comedian and actor. He performs boke (sometimes tsukkomi) in the comedy duo Drunk Dragon. His partner is Taku Suzuki. He is nicknamed .

Tsukaji was born in Hannan, Osaka. He graduated from Hannan Municipal Tottori Junior High School, Osaka Prefectural Sano High School and Momoyama Gakuin University Department of Economics.

Tsukaji co-starred with the comedy duo Hokuyō, who shared the same agency, in Haneru no Tobira.

Filmography

TV dramas

Films

Regular programmes

References

External links
 

Japanese comedians
Japanese male actors
People from Hannan, Osaka
1971 births
Living people